Colaranea is a genus of orb-weaver spiders first described by D. J. Court & Raymond Robert Forster in 1988 that are endemic to New Zealand.

Description 
Colaranea have variable colouration, but are typically brown, red, yellow and especially green.

Distribution 
Colaranea are widespread throughout the North Island and South Island of New Zealand.

Species
 it contains four species, all found in New Zealand:
Colaranea brunnea Court & Forster, 1988 – New Zealand
Colaranea melanoviridis Court & Forster, 1988 – New Zealand
Colaranea verutum (Urquhart, 1887) – New Zealand
Colaranea viriditas (Urquhart, 1887) – New Zealand

References

Araneidae
Araneomorphae genera
Spiders of New Zealand
Taxa named by Raymond Robert Forster